This is a list of high schools in the state of Nebraska.

Adams County
 Adams Central Junior-Senior High School, Hastings
 Hastings Senior High School, Hastings
 Kenesaw Secondary School, Kenesaw
 St. Cecilia High School, Hastings
 Silver Lake High School, Roseland

Antelope County
 Clearwater High School, Clearwater 
 Elgin High School, Elgin
 Neligh-Oakdale Junior/Senior High School, Neligh
 Orchard High School, Orchard
 Pope John XXIII Central Catholic High School, Elgin

Arthur County
 Arthur County High School, Arthur

Banner County
 Banner County High School, Harrisburg

Blaine County
 Sandhills High School, Dunning

Boone County
 Boone Central High School, Albion
 Riverside Public School, Cedar Rapids
 St. Edward High School, St. Edward

Box Butte County
 Alliance High School, Alliance
 Hemingford High School, Hemingford

Boyd County
 Butte High School, Butte (closed)
 Lynch Secondary School, Lynch (dissolved; consolidation with Boyd County High School)
 West Boyd High School, Spencer (dissolved; consolidation with Boyd County High School)
 Boyd County High School, Spencer

Brown County
 Ainsworth High School, Ainsworth

Buffalo County
 Amherst High School, Amherst
 Elm Creek High School, Elm Creek
 Gibbon High School, Gibbon
 Kearney Catholic High School, Kearney
 Kearney High School, Kearney
 Pleasanton High School, Pleasanton
 Ravenna Senior High School, Ravenna
 Shelton High School, Shelton
 West Kearney High School, Kearney

Burt County
 Lyons-Decatur Northeast Secondary School, Lyons
 Oakland-Craig Senior High School, Oakland
 Tekamah-Herman High School, Tekamah

Butler County
 Aquinas High School, David City
 David City Secondary School, David City
 East Butler High School, Brainard

Cass County
 Conestoga Junior/Senior High School, Murray
 Elmwood-Murdock Junior/Senior High School, Murdock
 Louisville High School, Louisville
 Plattsmouth High School, Plattsmouth
 Weeping Water High School, Weeping Water

Cedar County
 Cedar Catholic High School, Hartington
 Coleridge High School, Coleridge (merged with Laurel-Concord)
 Hartington-Newcastle High School, Hartington
 Laurel-Concord-Coleridge High School, Laurel
 Randolph High School, Randolph
 Wynot Secondary School, Wynot

Chase County
 Chase County High School, Imperial
 Wauneta-Palisade High School, Wauneta

Cherry County
 Cody-Kilgore High School, Cody
 Valentine High School, Valentine

Cheyenne County
 Leyton High School, Dalton
 Potter-Dix High School, Potter
 Sidney High School, Sidney

Clay County
 Clay Center High School, Clay Center (merged into Sandy Creek)
 Harvard High School, Harvard
 Sandy Creek High School, Fairfield
 Sutton Secondary School, Sutton

Colfax County
 Clarkson Junior-Senior High School, Clarkson
 Howells-Dodge Junior/Senior High School, Howells
 Leigh High School, Leigh
 Schuyler Central High School, Schuyler

Cuming County
 Bancroft-Rosalie High School, Bancroft
 Guardian Angels Central Catholic High School, West Point
 West Point-Beemer High School, West Point
 Wisner-Pilger High School, Wisner

Custer County
 Anselmo-Merna, Merna
 Ansley High School, Ansley
 Arnold High School, Arnold
 Broken Bow High School, Broken Bow
 Callaway High School, Callaway
 Sargent High School, Sargent

Dakota County
 Homer High School, Homer
 South Sioux Senior High School, South Sioux City

Dawes County
 Chadron Senior High School, Chadron
 Crawford High School, Crawford

Dawson County
 Cozad High School, Cozad
 Gothenburg High School, Gothenburg|
 Lexington High School, Lexington
 Overton High School, Overton
 Sumner-Eddyville-Miller High School, Sumner

Deuel County
 Creek Valley High School, Chappell
 South Platte High School, Big Springs

Dixon County
 Allen High School, Allen
 Newcastle High School, Newcastle (dissolved; consolidation into Hartington-Newcastle)
 Ponca High School, Ponca

Dodge County
 Archbishop Bergan High School, Fremont
 Dodge High School, Dodge (dissolved; consolidation into Howells-Dodge)
 Fremont Senior High School, Fremont
 Logan View Junior/Senior High School, Hooper
 North Bend Central Junior/Senior High School, North Bend
 Scribner-Snyder Secondary School, Scribner

Douglas County

 Bennington High School, Bennington
 Douglas County West High School, Valley
 Ralston High School, Ralston

Omaha

Public Schools

Elkhorn High School
Elkhorn North High School
Elkhorn South High School
 Keith Lutz Horizon High School
 Millard Public Schools
 Millard North High School
 Millard South High School
 Millard West High School
 Omaha Benson High School
 Omaha Buena Vista High School
 Omaha Burke High School
 Omaha Career Center School
 Omaha Central High School
 Omaha North High School
 Omaha Northwest High School
 Omaha South High School
 Omaha Westview High School
 Westside High School

Private Schools

 Brownell-Talbot School
 Creighton Preparatory School
 Duchesne Academy
 Marian High School
 Mercy High School
 Mount Michael Benedictine High School
 Roncalli Catholic High School
 V. J. and Angela Skutt Catholic High School

Dundy County
 Dundy County-Stratton High School, Benkelman

Fillmore County
 Exeter-Milligan High School, Exeter
 Fillmore Central High School, Geneva
 Shickley High School, Shickley

Franklin County
 Franklin Secondary School, Franklin

Frontier County
 Eustis-Farnam High School, Eustis
 Maywood High School, Maywood
 Medicine Valley Junior-Senior High School, Curtis

Furnas County
 Arapahoe High School, Arapahoe
 Cambridge High School, Cambridge
 Southern Valley Junior/Senior High School, Oxford

Gage County
 Beatrice High School, Beatrice
 Diller-Odell Secondary School, Odell
 Freeman High School, Adams
 Southern High School, Wymore

Garden County
 Garden County High School, Oshkosh

Garfield County
 Burwell Junior-Senior High School, Burwell

Gosper County
 Elwood High School, Elwood

Grant County
 Hyannis High School, Hyannis

Greeley County
 Central Valley High School, Greeley
 Spalding Academy, Spalding

Hall County
 Central Catholic High School, Grand Island
 Doniphan-Trumbull Secondary School, Doniphan
 Grand Island Senior High School, Grand Island
 Northwest High School, Grand Island
 Wood River Rural High School, Wood River

Hamilton County
 Aurora High School, Aurora
 Giltner High School, Giltner
 Hampton High School, Hampton

Harlan County
 Alma High School, Alma

Hayes County
 Hayes Center Secondary School, Hayes Center

Hitchcock County
 Hitchcock County High School, Trenton

Holt County
 Chambers High School, Chambers
 Ewing High School, Ewing
 O'Neill High School, O'Neill
 St. Mary's Junior-Senior High School, O'Neill
 Stuart High School, Stuart
 West Holt Rural High School, Atkinson

Hooker County
 Mullen High School, Mullen

Howard County
 Centura Public School, Cairo
 Elba Secondary School, Elba
 St. Paul High School, St. Paul

Jefferson County
 Fairbury Junior-Senior High School, Fairbury
 Meridian High School, Daykin
 Tri County Junior-Senior High School, DeWitt

Johnson County
 Johnson County Central Public Schools, Tecumseh/Cook
 Sterling High School, Sterling

Kearney County
 Axtell High School, Axtell
 Minden High School, Minden
 Wilcox-Hildreth High School, Wilcox

Keith County
 Ogallala High School, Ogallala
 Paxton High School, Paxton

Keya Paha County
 Keya Paha County High School, Springview

Kimball County
 Kimball Junior/Senior High School, Kimball

Knox County
 Bloomfield Junior-Senior High School, Bloomfield
 Creighton Community High School, Creighton
 Crofton High School, Crofton
 Niobrara Secondary School, Niobrara
 Santee High School, Niobrara
 Verdigre High School, Verdigre
 Wausa High School, Wausa

Lancaster County
 Berniklan Education Solutions School, Lincoln
 Lincoln Christian High School, Lincoln
 Lincoln Lutheran Middle/High School, Lincoln
 Lincoln Public Schools
 Arts and Humanities Focus Program, Lincoln
 Lincoln East High School, Lincoln
 Lincoln High School, Lincoln
 Lincoln North Star High School, Lincoln
 Lincoln Northeast High School, Lincoln
 Lincoln Southeast High School, Lincoln
 Lincoln Southwest High School, Lincoln
 Science Focus Program (Zoo School), Lincoln
 Malcolm Junior/Senior High School, Malcolm
 Norris High School, Firth
 Pius X High School, Lincoln
 Raymond Central, Raymond
 Waverly High School, Waverly

Lincoln County
 Brady High School, Brady
 Hershey High School, Hershey
 Maxwell High School, Maxwell
 North Platte High School, North Platte
 St. Patrick High School, North Platte
 Sutherland High School, Sutherland
 Wallace High School, Wallace

Logan County
 Stapleton High School, Stapleton

Loup County
 Loup County High School, Taylor

Madison County
 Battle Creek High School, Battle Creek
 Elkhorn Valley Schools, Tilden
 Lutheran High School Northeast, Norfolk
 Madison High School, Madison
 Newman Grove High School, Newman Grove
 Norfolk Catholic High School, Norfolk
 Norfolk Senior High School, Norfolk

McPherson County
 McPherson County High School, Tryon

Merrick County
 Central City High School, Central City
 Nebraska Christian Schools, Central City
 Palmer Junior-Senior High School, Palmer

Morrill County
 Bayard Secondary School, Bayard
 Bridgeport High School, Bridgeport

Nance County
 Fullerton High School, Fullerton
 Twin River High School, Genoa

Nemaha County
 Auburn High School, Auburn
 Johnson-Brock High School, Johnson

Nuckolls County
 Lawrence/Nelson Secondary School, Nelson
 Superior Secondary School, Superior

Otoe County
 High School at Syracuse, Syracuse
 Junior-Senior High School at Palmyra, Palmyra
 Lourdes Central Catholic High School (Nebraska), Nebraska City
 Nebraska City High School, Nebraska City

Pawnee County
 Lewiston High School, Lewiston
 Pawnee City Secondary School, Pawnee City

Perkins County
 Perkins County High School, Grant

Phelps County
 Bertrand High School, Bertrand
 Holdrege High School, Holdrege
 Loomis Secondary School, Loomis

Pierce County
 Osmond High School, Osmond
 Pierce Junior/Senior High School, Pierce
 Plainview Secondary School, Plainview

Platte County
 Columbus High School, Columbus
 Humphrey Junior-Senior High School, Humphrey
 Lakeview High School, Columbus
 Lindsay Holy Family School, Lindsay
 St. Francis High School, Humphrey
 Scotus Central Catholic High School, Columbus

Polk County
 Cross County High School-Stromsburg, Stromsburg
 High Plains Community High School, Polk
 Osceola High School, Osceola
 Shelby-Rising City High School, Shelby

Red Willow County
 McCook Senior High School, McCook
 Southwest Jr Senior High School, Bartley

Richardson County
 Falls City Senior High School, Falls City
 High School at Dawson, Dawson (closed)
 Humboldt Table Rock Steinauer High School, Humboldt
 Sacred Heart School, Falls City
 Southeast Nebraska Consolidated High School, Stella (closed)

Rock County
 Rock County High School, Bassett

Saline County
 Crete High School, Crete
 Dorchester High School, Dorchester
 Friend High School, Friend
 Wilber-Clatonia High School, Wilber

Sarpy County
 Bellevue Public Schools
 Bellevue East High School, Bellevue
 Bellevue West High School, Bellevue
 Daniel J. Gross Catholic High School, Bellevue
 Gretna High School, Gretna
 Omaha Bryan High School, Bellevue
 Papillion-La Vista Public Schools
 Papillion La Vista Senior High School, Papillion
 Papillion-La Vista South High School, Papillion
 IDEAL School, Papillion
 Platteview Senior High School, Springfield

Saunders County
 Ashland-Greenwood High School, Ashland
 Bishop Neumann High School, Wahoo
 Cedar Bluffs High School, Cedar Bluffs
 Mead High School, Mead
 Wahoo High School, Wahoo
 Yutan High School, Yutan

Scotts Bluff County
 Gering High School, Gering
 Minatare High School, Minatare
 Mitchell High School, Mitchell
 Morrill High School, Morrill
 Scottsbluff High School, Scottsbluff

Seward County
 Centennial Junior-Senior High School, Utica
 Milford High School, Milford
 Seward High School, Seward

Sheridan County
 Gordon-Rushville High School, Gordon
 Hay Springs High School, Hay Springs

Sherman County
 Litchfield High School, Litchfield
 Loup City High School, Loup City

Sioux County
 Sioux County High School, Harrison

Stanton County
 Stanton High School, Stanton

Thayer County
 Bruning-Davenport High School, Bruning
 Deshler High School, Deshler
 Thayer Central High School, Hebron

Thomas County
 Thedford Rural High School, Thedford

Thurston County
 Emerson-Hubbard High School, Emerson
 Omaha Nation High School, Macy
 Pender High School, Pender
 Walthill High School, Walthill
 Winnebago High School, Winnebago

Valley County
 Arcadia High School, Arcadia
 Ord Junior-Senior High School, Ord

Washington County
 Arlington High School, Arlington
 Blair High School, Blair
 Fort Calhoun High School, Fort Calhoun

Wayne County
 Wakefield High School, Wakefield
 Wayne High School, Wayne
 Winside High School, Winside

Webster County
 Blue Hill High School, Blue Hill
 Red Cloud High School, Red Cloud

Wheeler County
 Wheeler Central High School, Bartlett

York County
 Heartland Community High School, Henderson
 McCool Junction Junior-Senior High School, McCool Junction
 Nebraska Lutheran High School, Waco
 York High School (Nebraska)|York High School, York

See also 
 List of school districts in Nebraska

External links 
 List of high schools in Nebraska from SchoolTree.org
 List of most Nebraska high schools from the Nebraska School Activities Association

Nebraska
High Schools